Bionectria is a genus of fungi in the class Sordariomycetes. The genus was described in 1919 by mycologist Carlos Luigi Spegazzini to include species of Nectria that grew on living plant material.

Species

B. apocyni
B. aurantia
B. aureofulva
B. aureofulvella
B. byssicola
B. capitata
B. compactiuscula
B. coronata
B. epichloe
B. gibberosa
B. grammicospora
B. grammicosporopsis
B. impariphialis
B. intermedia
B. kowhai
B. lasiacidis
B. levigata
B. lucifer
B. mellea
B. oblongispora
B. ochroleuca
B. parva
B. parviphialis
B. pityrodes
B. pseudochroleuca
B. pseudostriata
B. pseudostriatopsis
B. ralfsii
B. rossmaniae
B. samuelsii
B. sesquicillii
B. setosa
B. solani
B. sporodochialis
B. subquaternata
B. tonduzii
B. tornata
B. truncata
B. verrucispora
B. vesiculosa
B. wenpingii
B. zelandiae-novae

References

Further reading

Bionectriaceae
Sordariomycetes genera
Taxa named by Carlo Luigi Spegazzini